Indian Creek Senior High School is a high school in Trafalgar, Indiana. It is a part of the Nineveh-Hensley-Jackson United School Corporation, serving Trafalgar, Morgantown, Indiana, Painted Hills, Indiana, and Princes Lakes.

See also
 List of high schools in Indiana

References

External links
Indian Creek High School's official website
Nineveh-Hensley Jackson School Corporation's official website

Public high schools in Indiana
Schools in Johnson County, Indiana